The Design of Design: Essays from a Computer Scientist is a book by Fred Brooks.

References

2010 non-fiction books